Parnlekha Wanmuang, nicknamed Por (born September 8, 1963 in Bangkok, Thailand) is Miss Thailand World 1985. she represented Thailand in the Miss World 1985 pageant held in UK.

References

1963 births
Living people
Parnlekha Wanmuang
Miss World 1985 delegates
Parnlekha Wanmuang
Miss Thailand World